Höglekardalen is a small village in Åre Municipality, Jämtland County in central to northwestern Sweden. Since it has got fewer than 200 inhabitants it does not meet the requirements to be a formal locality. It hosts a weather station and an outdoors sports area both in summer and winter. It is located in a steep valley between high mountains.

Climate
Höglekardalen has hosted an SMHI weather station since 1962. Höglekardalen has a subarctic climate (Köppen Dfc), with long, cold, albeit moderated winters and short summers where warm days are rare. Due to the influence from the North Atlantic Current, Höglekardalen receives plenty of snow in winter and also frequent rainfall in summer.

References

Populated places in Åre Municipality
Jämtland
Ski areas and resorts in Sweden